Warwick Light, also known as Warwick Lighthouse, is an historic lighthouse in Warwick, Rhode Island, United States.

History
The first light on the site was built in 1827. The original keeper's residence was replaced in 1899. The current structure at Warwick Neck was built on the site in 1932. In 1985, the light was the last Rhode Island lighthouse automated. The light was listed on the National Register of Historic Places in 1988 as Warwick Lighthouse.

See also
National Register of Historic Places listings in Kent County, Rhode Island

Notes

Further reading
America's Atlantic Coast Lighthouse, Kenneth Kochel, 1996. 
Northeast Lights: Lighthouses and Lightships, Rhode Island to Cape May, New Jersey, Robert Bachand, 1989. 
The Keeper's Log, Spring 1986.
 

Buildings and structures in Warwick, Rhode Island
Narragansett Bay
Lighthouses completed in 1827
Lighthouses completed in 1932
Lighthouses on the National Register of Historic Places in Rhode Island
National Register of Historic Places in Kent County, Rhode Island
Tourist attractions in Kent County, Rhode Island
Transportation buildings and structures in Kent County, Rhode Island
1827 establishments in Rhode Island